Camaropella is a genus of fungi within the Boliniaceae family.

External links

Sordariomycetes genera
Boliniales